Drechow is a municipality in the Vorpommern-Rügen district, in Mecklenburg-Vorpommern, Germany. Drechow is approximately 184 km by road north of Germany's capital, Berlin, and is very close to the city of Bad Sülze which is of historical significance and known for its Salt Museum and spa system.

References